The 2021 Swedish Open was a tennis tournament played on outdoor clay courts as part of the ATP Tour 250 Series of the 2021 ATP Tour and as part of the WTA 125K Series. It took place in Båstad, Sweden, from 12 through 18 July 2021 for the men's tournament, and from 5 through 10 July 2021 for the women's tournament. It was the 73rd edition of the event for the men and the 11th edition for the women.

Champions

Men's singles

  Casper Ruud def.  Federico Coria, 6–3, 6–3

Women's singles

  Nuria Párrizas Díaz def.  Olga Govortsova 6–2, 6–2

Men's doubles

  Sander Arends /  David Pel def.  Andre Begemann /  Albano Olivetti, 6–4, 6–2

Women's doubles

  Mirjam Björklund /  Leonie Küng def.  Tereza Mihalíková /  Kamilla Rakhimova 5–7, 6–3, [10–5]

Points and prize money

Point distribution

Prize money 

*per team

ATP singles main-draw entrants

Seeds

 1 Rankings are as of 28 June 2021.

Other entrants
The following players received wildcards into the main draw:
  Holger Rune
  Elias Ymer
  Mikael Ymer

The following players received entry from the qualifying draw:
  Francisco Cerúndolo
  Henri Laaksonen
  Dennis Novak
  Arthur Rinderknech

Withdrawals 
Before the tournament
  Carlos Alcaraz → replaced by  Taro Daniel
  Alejandro Davidovich Fokina → replaced by  Roberto Carballés Baena
  Ilya Ivashka → replaced by  Facundo Bagnis
  Denis Shapovalov → replaced by  Pedro Sousa
  Stefano Travaglia → replaced by  Salvatore Caruso
  Jo-Wilfried Tsonga → replaced by  Yannick Hanfmann
During the tournament
  Henri Laaksonen

ATP doubles main-draw entrants

Seeds

1 Rankings are as of 28 June 2021.

Other entrants
The following pairs received wildcards into the doubles main draw:
  Filip Bergevi /  Markus Eriksson
  Carl Söderlund /  Elias Ymer

Withdrawals
Before the tournament
  Marco Cecchinato /  Stefano Travaglia → replaced by  Roberto Carballés Baena /  Marco Cecchinato
  Rohan Bopanna /  Divij Sharan → replaced by  Jeevan Nedunchezhiyan /  Purav Raja
  Radu Albot /  Ilya Ivashka → replaced by  Radu Albot /  Denys Molchanov
  Carlos Alcaraz /  Marc López → replaced by  Andre Begemann /  Albano Olivetti
During the tournament
  Roberto Carballés Baena /  Marco Cecchinato

WTA singles main-draw entrants

Seeds

 1 Rankings are as of 28 June 2021.

Other entrants
The following players received wildcards into the main draw:
  Vanessa Ersöz
  Caijsa Hennemann
  Fanny Östlund
  Lisa Zaar

The following players received entry using protected rankings:
  Daria Lopatetska
  Karman Thandi

Withdrawals 
Before the tournament
  Hailey Baptiste → replaced by  Katie Volynets
  Cristina Bucșa → replaced by  Daria Lopatetska
  Asia Muhammad → replaced by  Anna Bondár
  Storm Sanders → replaced by  Francesca Jones
  Clara Tauson → replaced by  Karman Thandi

WTA doubles main-draw entrants

Seeds

1 Rankings are as of 28 June 2021.

References

External links 

 

Swedish Open
Swedish Open
Swedish Open
Swedish Open
Swedish Open